Ganei Tal (lit. Gardens of Dew) is a moshav in central Israel. Located to the south of Gedera, it falls under the jurisdiction of Nahal Sorek Regional Council.

History
The village was established in 2010 by former settlers who had been removed from the Gaza Strip as a result of the disengagement plan and who had been temporarily housed in Yad Binyamin. Built next to Hafetz Haim, it was named after the former settlement of the same name.

References

Moshavim
2010 establishments in Israel
Populated places established in 2010
Populated places in Central District (Israel)